The Korg Electribe EM-1 is a digital synthesizer first produced by Korg in 1999, alongside the EA-1 and ER-1. Korg discontinued production of the EM-1 in 2002 and replaced the model with the Electribe EMX.

The EM-1 combines a drum machine and two-part synthesizer with a sequencer.  Its design combined elements of the Korg Electribe EA-1 and ER-1 to offer an "all-in-one" groovebox. The Electribe series was noted for its compact size, weighing 1.25 kg and measuring only 300mm x 222mm x 55mm.

The synth's sound engine consists of 50 synth and 144 drum waveforms, both pitch and rhythmic in nature.  Waveform editing capabilities include: volume, panning, envelope, filtering, roll-effect, internal effects processing, pitch, and glide (portamento). The filter is a 12 dB/oct low-pass with cutoff and resonance controls.

The onboard sequencer can hold 256 patterns which can be chained together to form a "song". Up to 16 "songs" can be stored in the EM-1's internal memory.

The EM-1 was targeted at semi-professional DJs and musicians, but it was also adopted by professional musicians and bands, including British techno group The Prodigy, who used it on a number of recordings and live performances.

Although the EM-1 was not supplied with an editing interface for PC or Mac, an aftermarket editor for PC was developed by H.J. Stulgies of German company Midiweb with assistance from Korg and released as shareware. The editor significantly expanded the speed at which the EM-1 could be programmed.

References

External links

 Korg EM-1 Review on VintageSynth.com 

 Korg EM-1 User manual 
 Korg EM-1 Editor 

Electribe EM-1
Drum machines